Vaiola Tiere (born 25 July 1977) in the Cook Islands is a footballer who plays as a goalkeeper. He currently plays for Titikaveka in the Cook Islands Round Cup and the Cook Islands national football team.

References

1977 births
Living people
Cook Islands international footballers
Association football goalkeepers
Cook Island footballers